Pero Pejić (born 28 November 1982) is a Croatian retired professional footballer who played as a striker.

With over 100 goals to his name, he is the highest scoring foreign player in Albanian football history. In 2015, Pero Pejić was one of the top 5 goalscorers in Europe.

Club career

Early career
Pejić began his career at local club NK Zmaj Makarska but soon moved to play for Vrbovec in 2000. After two years at the club, he decided to move to Croatia Sesvete, from there he moved to a bigger club, Slaven Belupo. After three and a half years at the Koprivnica club moved abroad for the first time to play for Albanian side Dinamo Tirana.

Dinamo Tirana
Pejić moved to Dinamo Tirana in January 2007 and became an immediate hit with fans and players alike, with his scoring ability and his general presence in the side. His first game in Albania was on 3 February 2007 away from home against Kastrioti Krujë in a hard-fought victory. He had to wait until 28 April for his first goal, which was to come in the Tirana derby against Tirana, Pejić scored in the 27th minute but it would prove to be only a consolation as the match was lost 2–1.

However that goal was to open the floodgates of the strikers scoring in Albania, as he managed to hit four goals past Shkumbini Peqin the next week in an emphatic 5–0 victory. The 2006–07 season was not a successful one for Dinamo Tirana as they did not win any trophies and the club only managed a 5th-place finish, although Pejić did score 6 times in 13 games for his side.

He started the 2007–08 season by scoring a hat-trick in the matchday 3 against Kastrioti Krujë, giving his team a comfortable 4–0 home win. Throughout the season, Pejić scored 18 league goals in 31 appearances, as Dinamo Tirana clinched its 17 Albanian Superliga title.

Kapfenberger SV
In July 2008, he moved to Austria with Kapfenberger SV. His debut in the Austrian top division came on 27 July 2008 against Red Bull Salzburg, after some delay because of the players pass, he came on as a 68th minute replacement for Arno Kozelsky. In the 2008–09 season, he scored in twelve league games completed two hits. After only one use in the 2009–10 season, he was dismissed by the Croatian Association for sports but also for disciplinary reasons

Return to Croatia Sesvete
In December 2010, he returned to his original club Croatia Sesvete.

Tirana

On 22 June 2010, Pejić returned to Albania by signing a one-year contract with Tirana for €300,000. He was handed squad number 22, and made his competitive debut on 1 July in the goalless draw against Zalaegerszegi in the 2010–11 UEFA Europa League first qualifying round. Tirana progressed to the next round by winning the second match 1–0 after extra time, where they were eliminated 5–1 on aggregate by Utrecht; Pejić played in both matches, and ended his European campaign with four matches.

Pejić made his domestic debut on 22 August in the 1–1 away draw against Elbasani, and scored his first goals for the team in the matchday 3 against Bylis Ballsh, giving his team the first victory of the season.

Flamurtari Vlorë
Pejić signed for Flamurtari Vlorë on 10 January 2012, along with fellow Croatian Toni Pezo. He made his league debut on 11 February in the 0–1 away win against Kamza, and scored his first goal on 4 March in the 1–1 draw against Teuta Durrës in his second appearance.

Skënderbeu Korçë
On 1 August 2012, Pejić joined the reigning champions Skënderbeu Korçë on a free transfer. He scored a hat-trick in his league debut on 24 August in the opening league match against Vllaznia Shkodër, which finished in a 3–1 win. He followed that by scoring in team's 1–1 home draw against Bylis Ballsh. Pejić continued with his solid performances by scoring his fifth league goal of the season in the 3–0 home win against Laçi in the matchday 4.

In his Albanian Cup debut for the club, Pejić scored twice in an eventual 7–2 thrashing of Olimpic in the first leg of the first round. Later on 27 October, Pejić scored both goals in the league encounter against his former club Tirana, placing Skënderbeu in the first place; that was his eighth league goal of the season and tenth overall. He added another two to his tally during the match against Flamurtari Vlorë, which finished in a 3–1 home win.

On 15 December, Pejić scored two times in the 4–2 convincing win against Kukësi in the first match of Albanian Cup Group A. He scored again in this competitions four days later in the 2–1 win against Kastrioti Krujë.

Pejić started 2013 by scoring two goals in the 5–1 home win against Kastrioti Krujë in the team's first competitive match of the year. After going scoreless in the next two matches, Pejić returned on the scoresheet on 24 February during the 3–0 win against Bylis Ballsh. During the match, he suffered in injury which kept him sidelined for the match against Laçi. He returned on the field on 9 March in the match against Tomori Berat by entering as a substitute, and scored his first goal after three months during the 4–3 away defeat to Kukësi. Pejić finished the season by scoring 18 goals between league and cup in 29 appearances, as Skënderbeu Korçë were crowned champions of Albania for the third consecutive season.

Kukësi

On 16 June 2014, Pejić joined Kukësi on free agent, signing a one-year contract with worth €80,000 a year. He was handed squad number 22, a number which he previously held with Skënderbeu Korçë. During his presentation, the Croatian striker explained that the reason he signed with Kukësi was due to the expiry of his contract with Skënderbeu on 31 May and because a debt which the club had not paid to him. This was the reason why he did not sign the renewal contract with Albanian champions.

He made his competitive debut on 24 August in the opening league match of the season against Vllaznia Shkodër at Loro Boriçi Stadium, scoring the first of the match in an eventual 2–1 win. He followed that by scoring in the 3–0 home win against the newly promoted side Elbasani on 31 August. He returned in the scoresheet on 26 September in the matchday 5, scoring the lone goal against Apolonia Fier. On 1 October, in the first leg of Albanian Cup first round, Pejić scored twice to help the team overcome the 1–0 disadvantage against the underdogs of Vora. He continued with his goalscoring form, scoring the winner against Teuta Durrës on 5 October and another two against Elbasani on 2 November. Pejić started December with a brace against Teuta Durrës on 12th, helping the team to win the match 0–3, and later scored the only goal in the 1–0 victory against Flamurtari Vlorë. Kukësi ended the first part of the season as the "winter champions" with 38 points, while Pejić scored 10 goals in 17 matches.

Esteghlal

On 2 August 2015, Pejić Joined Iranian Pro League club Esteghlal signing a two-year contract. On 14 August 2015, he made his debut for Esteghlal in a match against Zob Ahan. He scored his debut goal in a Hazfi Cup match against Shahrdari Semnan. On 20 November 2015, Pejić came off the bench in the 86th minute and scored the second goal in a 2–0 away victory over Foolad.

Return to Kukësi
Pejić returned to Albania and despite interest from several Albanian Superliga clubs he decided to return to Kukësi on 30 July 2016 following a year long absence. He made his return debut on 25 August in the 2016 Albanian Supercup against Skënderbeu, starting and scoring his team's third goal in an eventual 3–1 win, winning his first silverware with the club. He made his first league appearance of the season on 7 September in the goalless draw against Vllaznia in the opening day, and scored his first two goals in the following match, a 3–0 home win against Teuta.

In September 2016, he was named Albanian Superliga Player of the Month for the second time in his career after bagging three goals in four matches. He also become the first foreign player to win the award twice and the first to win it with two different teams. On 1 October, in the clash against the rivals of Partizani at home, Pejić scored the lone goal, heading home a Rrahman Hallaçi cross in the 47th minute to give his team the second ever victory against the capital club. On 18 December, in the match against title challengers Skënderbeu at home, Pejić scored both goals to seal a 2–0 win, becoming the first player to reach double figures in the league. In the last match of 2016, Pejić scored his 11th goal of the season via penalty kick in the away confrontation against Luftëtari, as Kukësi ended the first part of the league as "Winter Champions".

Pejić started 2017 on 27 January in team's league match Vllaznia, notably scoring the winner with a curled right-footed free-kick to help Kukësi extend the gap. Later on 15 April, Pejić scored both goals in a 2–1 home win over Laçi to keep Kukësi top of table tied with Partizani with 5 matches remaining. On 15 May, he scored his first hat-trick of the season and the 8th Albanian Superliga hat-trick against Korabi, becoming the third player with most hat-tricks scored in the league. Five days later, in the decisive league match against Skënderbeu, Pejić produced a Man of the Match performance by scoring both goals, including a last-minute goal, as Kukësi defeated 9-man Skënderbeu 2–0 at home to be crowned Albanian Superliga champions for the first time in history. It was Pejić's 4th Albanian Superliga trophy with three different teams.

Return to Slaven Belupo
On 29 July 2017, Pejić returned to his homeland and joined Croatian top flight Slaven Belupo on a one-year contract, returning at The Pharmacists after 10 years. He was allocated squad number 9 for the 2017–18 season. Pejić made his return debut on 5 August by playing the second half of the 2–1 home win over Cibalia, and opened his scoring account later on 26 August by netting in the 2–2 draw versus Rudeš.

Personal life

Pejić is married and has two sons (twins). He speaks fluent Croatian and Albanian.

Career statistics

Honours
Dinamo Tirana
  Albanian Superliga: 2007–08

Tirana
 Albanian Cup: 2010–11

Skënderbeu Korçë
 Albanian Superliga: 2012–13, 2013–14
 Albanian Supercup: 2013

Kukësi
 Albanian Superliga: 2016-17
 Albanian Supercup: 2016

Individual
 Albanian Superliga Golden Boot: 2013–14, 2014–15, 2016–17
 Albanian Superliga Player of the Month: September 2012, September 2016

References

External links
 

1982 births
Living people
Sportspeople from Makarska
Association football forwards
Croatian footballers
Croatia youth international footballers
NK Vrbovec players
NK Croatia Sesvete players
NK Slaven Belupo players
FK Dinamo Tirana players
Kapfenberger SV players
KF Tirana players
Al-Faisaly FC players
Flamurtari Vlorë players
KF Skënderbeu Korçë players
FK Kukësi players
Esteghlal F.C. players
Croatian Football League players
Austrian Football Bundesliga players
Kategoria Superiore players
Saudi Professional League players
Persian Gulf Pro League players
Croatian expatriate footballers
Expatriate footballers in Austria
Croatian expatriate sportspeople in Austria
Expatriate footballers in Albania
Croatian expatriate sportspeople in Albania
Expatriate footballers in Saudi Arabia
Croatian expatriate sportspeople in Saudi Arabia
Expatriate footballers in Iran
Croatian expatriate sportspeople in Iran